The Degüello (Spanish: El toque a degüello) is a bugle call, notable in the United States for its use as a march by Mexican Army buglers during the 1836 Siege and Battle of the Alamo to signal that the defenders of the garrison would receive no quarter by the attacking Mexican Army under General Antonio López de Santa Anna. The Degüello was introduced to the Americas by the Spanish armies and was later adopted by the patriot armies fighting against them during the Spanish American wars of independence. It was also widely used by Simon Bolivar's armies, notably during the Battle of Junin and the Battle of Ayacucho.

"Degüello" is a Spanish noun from the verb "degollar", to describe the action of throat-cutting.  More figuratively, it means "give no quarter." It "signifies the act of beheading or throat-cutting and in Spanish history became associated with the battle music, which, in different versions, meant complete destruction of the enemy without mercy."  It is similar to the war cry "¡A degüello!" used by Cuban rebels in the 19th century to launch mounted charges against the Spanish infantry.

Musical compositions
Martha Keller's The Alamo in Brady's Bend and Other Ballads, published in 1946, became popularized through Juanita Coulson's folk song, "No Quarter, No Quarter."  In it, Keller wrote, "When they sound the 'No Quarter', they'll rise to the slaughter, when they play 'The Deguello', the wail of despair."

K. R. Wood's 1997 compilation album Fathers of Texas explains the bugle call and what it meant at the Alamo through song and narration.

Depiction in films
In films, El Degüello varies, sometimes markedly.

It is an instrumental in the two John Wayne films Rio Bravo (1959) and The Alamo (1960), and was also used in The Alamo (2004).  In the first two films mentioned, the same music is used: not the actual Deguello, but music written by film composer Dimitri Tiomkin. In the third film, it is in the form of a military dirge.

It is depicted as a bugle call
in Disney's Davy Crockett, King of the Wild Frontier (1955), in The Last Command (1955), in Viva Max! (1969), and in the made-for-television movie The Alamo: Thirteen Days to Glory (1987).

Degüello is the title of an episode of Endeavour, in Series 6, Episode 4 (2019).

See also
Bugle and trumpet calls of the Mexican Armed Forces

References

Military music
Bugle calls
Military history of Mexico
Spanish words and phrases
Death music